Positive Mental Octopus is a music video compilation from the funk rock band Red Hot Chili Peppers and was released in 1990 by EMI. The compilation was only released on VHS. It was superseded by the 1992 What Hits!? VHS and later DVD, which contained all the videos from this compilation and more not included in this release.

The release was given the 18 certificate by the British Board of Film Classification.

Track listing
"Taste the Pain"
"Higher Ground"
"Knock Me Down"
"Fight Like a Brave"
"Fire" (live)
"Jungle Man"
"Catholic School Girls Rule"
"True Men Don't Kill Coyotes"

Red Hot Chili Peppers video albums
1990 video albums